Patricio Prato (born November 24, 1979 in Buenos Aires) is a 194 cm tall Argentine basketballer. His father Fernando was a player as well. Currently he plays for NGC Cantu. He played his college ball in the United States for St. Bonaventure University.

Clubs
Atenas de Córdoba
Skipper Bologna
S.S. Felice Scandone
Solsonica Rieti

College
St. Bonaventure University

Titles
With the Argentina national basketball team
1996 South American Under-18 Championship
2003 South American Championship - 2nd place
2007 Pan American Games - 4th place

He also played for the Cordoba select teams: cadets in 1995 and mayor in 2000, 2001 and 2002.

References 

1979 births
Argentine men's basketball players
Atenas basketball players
Fortitudo Pallacanestro Bologna players
St. Bonaventure Bonnies men's basketball players
Argentine expatriate basketball people in Italy
Argentine expatriate basketball people in the United States
Living people
Basketball players at the 2003 Pan American Games
Basketball players at the 2007 Pan American Games
Basketball players from Buenos Aires
Pan American Games competitors for Argentina